Dysphenges is a genus of flea beetles in the family Chrysomelidae. There are 4 described species in North America and Central America.

Selected species
 Dysphenges penrosei
 Dysphenges rileyi Gilbert & Andrews, 2002
 Dysphenges secretus

References

Alticini
Chrysomelidae genera
Articles created by Qbugbot
Taxa named by George Henry Horn